The following is a list of books and essays about Terrence Malick.

Malick